Bedington is an unincorporated community on Hoke Run, near its confluence with Opequon Creek, in Berkeley County, West Virginia, United States. It is located east of Hainesville on County Route 5. According to the Geographic Names Information System, Bedington has also been known as Beddington, Bedenton, and The Lick.

The community derives its name from Colonel Bedinger, an early settler.

References

Unincorporated communities in Berkeley County, West Virginia
Unincorporated communities in West Virginia